This is a list of the National Register of Historic Places listings in St. Croix County, Wisconsin. It is intended to provide a comprehensive listing of entries in the National Register of Historic Places that are located in St. Croix County, Wisconsin.  The locations of National Register properties for which the latitude and longitude coordinates are included below may be seen in a map.

There are 36 properties and districts listed on the National Register in the county. Another property was once listed but has been removed.

Current listings

|}

Former listings

|}

See also

List of National Historic Landmarks in Wisconsin
National Register of Historic Places listings in Wisconsin
Listings in neighboring counties: Barron, Dunn, Pierce, Polk, Washington (MN)

References

Saint Croix